Felipe de Sotelo Osorio  was a Spanish military leader who served as Governor of New Mexico between 1625 and 1630.

Biography
Felipe de Sotelo Osorio was not a practicing Catholic, so he did not usually go to Mass. He joined the Spanish Navy in his youth, eventually becoming an Admiral.

He was appointed Governor of Santa Fe de Nuevo México on 21 December 1625. At that time, Osorio lived in the modern-Mexico. However, he traveled to Santa Fe without the aid of any means of transport, which involved travelling 1500 miles. Accompanied by the Fray Alonso de Benavides, they reached the city on 6 February 1626.   

After becoming governor, Sotelo rejected the Roman Catholic Church that he viewed as a dictatorship, thus provoking clashes with the institution. 

It is said that Sotelo once joined a Catholic mass when this one had already started, and reproached some of his soldiers for not standing when they saw him entering the enclosure. Although the soldiers reminded him that they should alway remain seated before the Sanctus, Sotelo angrily insisted that they always had to stand up in his presence. Sotelo also said that if he was excommunicated by the church, he would force a priest to suspend that excommunication in just two hours. These statements (considered blasphemies by the Clergy) resulted in legal charges, which were led by the Inquisition.

Felipe de Sotelo Osorio was replaced by Francisco Manuel de Silva Nieto in 1630.

References 

Colonial governors of Santa Fe de Nuevo México